Nicklas Kulti was the defending champion, but lost in the second round this year.

Yevgeny Kafelnikov won the title, beating Petr Korda 7–6(7–2), 6–7(5–7), 7–6(9–7) in the final.

Seeds

Draw

Finals

Top half

Bottom half

References

 Main Draw

1997 Gerry Weber Open